Pampa Hermosa National Sanctuary is a protected area in Peru located in the region of Junín. It preserves one of the last pristine areas of montane forests in central Peru.

Geography 
Pampa Hermosa National Sanctuary is located between the provinces of Tarma and Chanchamayo, in the region of Junin, Peru. The area is mountainous, with an elvational range between 1340 and 3960 m.

Ecology 
Pampa Hermosa protects areas of tropical montane rainforests and high elevation grasslands.

Flora 
Plant species found in this protected area include: Cedrela angustifolia, Juglans neotropica, Retrophyllum rospigliosii, Iriartea deltoidea, Weinmannia sp., Escallonia myrtilloides, Pseudolmedia rigida, Alnus acuminata, Prumnopitys montana, Guarea guidonia, Styrax andinus, etc.

Fauna 
Animal species found in this protected area include: the Andean cock-of-the-rock, the Junín red squirrel, the yellow-throated toucan, the spectacled bear, the semicollared hawk, etc.

References 

Reserved zones of Peru
Geography of Junín Region